N-gum La is a village located in the Triangle Land of the Mali and Nmai rivers, in Kachin State, Burma. 
N-gumla High School, also called as No. 2 Government High School, is run by the KIO and it is famous in bearing many Kachin Leaders. The school was established in some 1970. It was burned by Burmese military soldiers in 1987, rebuilt in 1986 by bamboo and thatches, and in 2005 with concrete. It is also the oldest High school in the history of Kachin Revolution.

N-gum La is a village of about 66 households, under the administration of the KIO First Brigade.
The Triangle Area is populated by Hka Hku (up-river) Kachins and some Nungs. The Hkinduyang Valley is said to have been home to the Kachin people for more than 20 generations. The Hka Hku Kachins belong to the 'Gumlao' or Republican type of community described by Cap. (Dr) Leach in his book,Systems of Highland Burma: A Study of Kachin Social Structure.

This area is part of a region considered one of the most biodiverse in the world. Its unspoiled beauty - the exotic flora and fauna, the tiers of mountains, the numerous rapids and cascades, side streams that 'zup' or meet with the NMai River, and the stretches of white sand beaches along the river banks - looks just as pristine as in the photos documented in noted 'plant hunter' F. Kingdon Ward's books. Kingdon Ward made a number of visits to this area between 1914 and 1953, and the locals dubbed him "Nampan Du", or "Flower Chief". There is an 87-year-old man by the name of N-Nau Yaw, who said he worked as a porter for Kingdon Ward. He said he received one silver coin a day for his services. George Zunwa La Nu, the first Kachin Man, who got the highest education amongst N-gum La School Alumni, spent five years in N-gum La.

The Hkinduyang Valley is home to the hornbill and different species of other colourful birds. Black-winged, green-bodied butterflies, and other types of rare butterflies abound in the Valley. Over 20 varieties of native orchids, including ground orchids, grow abundantly near the footpaths. Flowering trees and shrubs, fruit trees such as persimmon and orange heavily laden with fruit, could also be seen along the way.

The climate is temperate and shift cultivation is practiced by everyone in the area.

References
www.metta-myanmar.org
www.kachinstate.com
Burma's Icy mountain

Populated places in Kachin State